Graciano Brito (born June 2, 1985 in São Nicolau) is a Cape Verdean footballer coach and former professional player. Brito is currently the head coach for the men's soccer team at Siena College.

Career

Youth and college
Brito came from his native Cape Verde to the United States in 2004, settling with relatives in Bridgeport, Connecticut, and played college soccer at Quinnipiac University. As a junior in 2007 he was named to the NSCAA/adidas All-America Second Team, was featured in Sports Illustrated's "Faces In The Crowd" section, was selected to the NSCAA/adidas North Atlantic Region First Team, and was named Northeast Conference Player of the Year, the first Quinnipiac men's soccer player to earn the award since 2001. As a senior in 2008 he was named the NEC Player of the Year for the second consecutive season, was Quinnipiac’s Male Athlete of the Year for the second year in a row, and was named to the All-NEC First Team, was an NCSAA/adidas All-American for the third consecutive year, and was a College Soccer News All-American. He finished his four-year career with Quinnipiac as the program’s Division I career leader in goals (40) and points (92).

Professional
Brito was an assistant coach at Quinnipiac in 2009, attended the 2009 MLS Combine, and briefly played professionally for Operário dos Açores in the Portuguese Second Division 2010, before becoming the first player to sign with the expansion FC New York of the new USL Professional League when he signed in February 2011. He scored the only goal of FCNY's first ever league victory, 1-0 over the Charleston Battery on May 13.

Brito signed with Rochester Rhinos of USL Pro on February 2, 2012.

Coaching
Brito returned to his alma mater Quinnipiac University in 2012 to take a role as an assistant coach with the men's soccer team. Brito coached with the Bobcats for eight seasons before being appointed head coach at Siena College. Brito also joined the technical staff of Black Watch Premier Academy in 2020.

References

External links
Siena Saints bio

1985 births
Living people
Cape Verdean footballers
Cape Verdean expatriate footballers
People from São Nicolau, Cape Verde
Quinnipiac Bobcats men's soccer players
F.C. New York players
Rochester New York FC players
AC Connecticut players
USL Championship players
USL League Two players
Expatriate soccer players in the United States
Association football forwards
Quinnipiac Bobcats men's soccer coaches
Siena Saints men's soccer coaches
Cape Verdean football managers